Klondike is an unincorporated community and census-designated place (CDP) in Allegany County, Maryland, United States. As of the 2010 census it had a population of 118.

Demographics

References

Stakem, Karen Hersick Klondike: A Coal Mining Town, 1999, Frostburg University Library, F189.K57 K57 1999.

Census-designated places in Allegany County, Maryland
Census-designated places in Maryland
Coal towns in Maryland